The Department of Northern Australia was an Australian government department that existed between June and December 1975.

Scope
Information about the department's functions and/or government funding allocation could be found in the Administrative Arrangements Orders, the annual Portfolio Budget Statements and in the Department's annual report.

The matters dealt with by the department at its creation were:
Administration of the Northern Territory of Australia and the Territory of Ashmore and Cartier Islands. 
In respect of the part of Australia north of the parallel 26 degrees south latitude:  
Matters related to the specialised development and utilisation of natural resources, being land, water and minerals  
Matters related to the production and marketing of sugar and beef, and the production, processing and export of minerals  
Specialised transport development projects, including beef and development roads, mining, railways and mineral port facilities  
In relation to the foregoing:  
The undertaking or support of research 
The planning or initiation of projects 
The co-ordination of activities in respect of projects 
Co-operation with the States and other authorities.

Structure
The Department was a Commonwealth Public Service department, staffed by officials who were responsible to the Minister for Northern Australia. The permanent head of the department was Allan O'Brien, initially based in Darwin and later based in Canberra.

References

Ministries established in 1975
Northern Australia
1975 establishments in Australia
1975 disestablishments in Australia